Xyloskenea grahami is a species of sea snail, a marine gastropod mollusk, unassigned in the superfamily Seguenzioidea.

Description
The height of the shell attains 2 mm. The shell is translucent to opaque white.

Distribution
This marine species occurs off New South Wales, Australia. They live on waterlogged wood, known from 439-714 m.

References

External links
 To World Register of Marine Species
 
 Seashells of new South Wales: Xyloskenea grahami

grahami
Gastropods described in 1988